John Roddick Kennedy (March 17, 1882 – September 28, 1935) was a Canadian amateur and professional ice hockey player. Kennedy, a defenceman, played most of his hockey in the amateur era, representing two storied clubs in the Montreal Wanderers and Montreal Victorias.

Career
Kennedy was twice a member of Stanley Cup winning teams, both times with the Montreal Wanderers, in 1906 and 1907.

In January 1908 Kennedy was part of a benefit All-Star game, hosted by the Eastern Canada Amateur Hockey Association, for the family of his deceased former teammate on the Montreal Wanderers Hod Stuart, who had died in June 1907 in a diving accident. Montreal Wanderers won the game against the ECAHA All-Stars 10 goals to 7.

During the 1909–10 season Kennedy played with the Montreal Nationals in the short-lived Canadian Hockey Association circuit.

Death
Kennedy died in Brantford, Ontario on September 28, 1935 after an illness lasting over four months. He had moved to Brantford from Quebec to manage a plant with the Lake of the Woods Milling Company.

Achievements
Stanley Cup – 1906 & 1907 (with Montreal Wanderers)

References

Bibliography

Notes

1882 births
1935 deaths
Canadian ice hockey defencemen
Montreal Wanderers players
Sportspeople from Quebec
Stanley Cup champions
Montreal Victorias players